Woodforde's Brewery is a  brewery located on Slad Lane in the village of Woodbastwick, in the county of Norfolk, England.  The brewery produced its first commercial brew in 1981 from original brewery in the village of Drayton north east of Norwich. In 1996 the brewery's popular Wherry bitter became CAMRA Supreme Champion Beer of Britain.

History

Good friends, Ray Ashworth and Dr David Crease, had been handcrafting their own beers since the 60s. Fuelled by a passion for home brewing, the pair fulfilled a lifelong ambition and opened their very own brewery, and Woodforde's was born. Named after Parson James Woodforde who lived at Weston Longville an 18th Century Parson, whose diaries spoke of his love of good food and beer. As the demand for Woodforde's brews grew, so did the need for a larger space to perfect their craft. Moving from Drayton near Norwich in 1989, a group of barns and listed farm buildings were found in Woodbastwick, a beautiful village in the winding Norfolk Broads. Here they have created after extensive renovations, a state-of-the-art brewery – where they can still be found today. In May 1992, The Fur & Feather Inn opened, built within a converted row of thatched cottages just steps from the brewery doors. With visitors making their way to Woodbastwick to sample brews for themselves, The Woodforde's Brewery Shop and Visitor Centre opened in 1995. A very special, and rare, accolade for a session beer: Woodforde's Wherry, was named CAMRA ‘Supreme Champion Beer of Britain’ in 1996. And when Norfolk Nog won the same award, they found ourselves in good company – one of a ‘tiny super league’ of just four British brewers to have won the title twice over.

In 2007, they opened a sixty barrel capacity brewhouse as production continued to expand. Today, there are two brew houses, which run around the clock. In April 2016, the brewery announced that the business had been sold to a group of investors. With three passionate people at the helm, they set their sights on taking Woodforde's far and beyond. By the end of 2017, Woodforde's was established as the largest brewery in Norfolk, producing over 20,000 barrels every year, with beers reaching fans across the country and around the globe. A new brand was launched, celebrating their proud heritage and ambitions for the future.

At the beginning of 2018, Master Brewer Neil Bain returned after two years away and takes his place as Head Brewer. In April 2018, Woodforde's partnered with Marks & Spencer to produce their British Lager which is available in cans across the UK.

Tied houses
The brewery has one tied house, in the county of Norfolk. The brewery itself has a Brewery tap called the Fur & Feather situated next to the brewery in the village of Woodbastwick.

Beers

References

External links
woodfordes.co.uk
The Fur and Feather website.

Companies based in Norfolk
Food and drink companies established in 1981
Breweries in England
British companies established in 1981
1981 establishments in England